is a Japanese superhero team metaseries and media franchise consisting of television series and films produced by Toei Company,  and Bandai, and aired by TV Asahi ("Sentai" is the Japanese word for "task force" or "fighting squadron"). The shows are of the tokusatsu genre, featuring live action characters and colorful special effects, and are aimed at children. Super Sentai airs alongside the Kamen Rider series in the Super Hero Time programming block on Sunday mornings. In North America, the Super Sentai series is best known as the source material for the Power Rangers series.

Series overview

In every Super Sentai series, the protagonists are a team of people who – using wrist-worn or hand-held devices – transform into superheroes and gain superpowers – color-coded uniforms, signature weapons, sidearms, and fighting skills – to battle a group of otherworldly supervillains that threaten to take over the Earth. In a typical episode, the heroes thwart the enemies' plans and defeat an army of enemy soldiers and the monster of the week before an enlarged version of the monster confronts them, only to be defeated again when the heroes fight it with their mecha. Each Sentai series is set in its own unique fictional universe; various TV, video, and film specials feature a team-up between one or more teams.

Super Sentai series
The first two Super Sentai series were created by Shotaro Ishinomori, then known for the 1971–1973 Kamen Rider TV series and the long-running manga Cyborg 009. He developed Himitsu Sentai Gorenger, which ran from 1975 to 1977, and J.A.K.Q. Dengekitai, released in 1977. Toei Company put the franchise on hiatus in 1978, collaborating with Marvel Comics to produce a live-action Spider-Man series, which added giant robots to the concept of tokusatsu shows. The giant robot concept was carried over to Toei and Marvel's next show, Battle Fever J, released in 1979, and was then used throughout the Super Sentai series.

Power Rangers

In 1993, American production company Saban Entertainment adapted 1992's Kyōryū Sentai Zyuranger into Mighty Morphin Power Rangers for the Fox Kids programming block, combining the original Japanese action footage with new footage featuring American actors for the story sequences. Since then, nearly every Super Sentai series that followed became a new season of Power Rangers. Some countries, such as France, Brazil, Thailand, and the Philippines, switched from broadcasting Super Sentai to Power Rangers. In 2002, Saban sold the Power Rangers franchise to Disney's Buena Vista division, who owned it until 2010, broadcasting Power Rangers on ABC Kids, ABC Family, Jetix, and Toon Disney. On 12 May 2010, Saban bought the franchise back from Disney, moving the show to the Nickelodeon network for 2011 with Power Rangers Samurai. On 1 May 2018, toy company Hasbro announced they had acquired the Power Rangers franchise from Saban Capital Group for $522 million.

Productions

Main series

The following is a list of the Super Sentai series and their years of broadcast:

Theatrical releases
 1975: Himitsu Sentai Gorenger (Movie version of episode 6)
 1975: Himitsu Sentai Gorenger: The Blue Fortress (Movie version of episode 15)
 1976: Himitsu Sentai Gorenger: The Red Death Match (Movie version of episode 36)
 1976: Himitsu Sentai Gorenger: The Bomb Hurricane
 1976: Himitsu Sentai Gorenger: Fire Mountain's Final Explosion (Movie version of episode 54)
 1977: J.A.K.Q. Dengekitai (Movie version of episode 7)
 1978: J.A.K.Q. Dengekitai vs. Gorenger
 1979: Battle Fever J (Movie version of episode 5)
 1980: Denshi Sentai Denjiman
 1981: Taiyo Sentai Sun Vulcan
 1982: Dai Sentai Goggle-V
 1983: Kagaku Sentai Dynaman
 1984: Choudenshi Bioman
 1985: Dengeki Sentai Changeman
 1985: Dengeki Sentai Changeman: Shuttle Base! Crisis!
 1986: Choushinsei Flashman
 1987: Choushinsei Flashman: Big Rally! Titan Boy!! (Movie version of episodes 15–18)
 1987: Hikari Sentai Maskman
 1989: Kousoku Sentai Turboranger
 1993: Gosei Sentai Dairanger
 1994: Ninja Sentai Kakuranger
 1994: Super Sentai World
 1994: Toei Hero Daishugō
 1995: Chouriki Sentai Ohranger
 2001: Hyakujuu Sentai Gaoranger: The Fire Mountain Roars
 2002: Ninpuu Sentai Hurricaneger: Shushutto The Movie
 2003: Bakuryū Sentai Abaranger DELUXE: Abare Summer is Freezing Cold!
 2004: Tokusou Sentai Dekaranger The Movie: Full Blast Action
 2005: Mahō Sentai Magiranger The Movie: Bride of Infershia ~Maagi Magi Giruma Jinga~
 2006: GoGo Sentai Boukenger The Movie: The Greatest Precious
 2007: Juken Sentai Gekiranger: Nei-Nei! Hou-Hou! Hong Kong Decisive Battle
 2008: Engine Sentai Go-onger: Boom Boom! Bang Bang! GekijōBang!!
 2009: Engine Sentai Go-onger vs. Gekiranger
 2009: Samurai Sentai Shinkenger the Movie: The Fateful War
 2010: Samurai Sentai Shinkenger vs. Go-onger: GinmakuBang!!
 2010: Tensou Sentai Goseiger: Epic on the Movie
 2011: Tensou Sentai Goseiger vs. Shinkenger: Epic on Ginmaku
 2011: Gokaiger Goseiger Super Sentai 199 Hero Great Battle
 2011: Kaizoku Sentai Gokaiger the Movie: The Flying Ghost Ship
 2012: Kaizoku Sentai Gokaiger vs. Space Sheriff Gavan: The Movie
 2012: Kamen Rider × Super Sentai: Super Hero Taisen
 2012: Tokumei Sentai Go-Busters the Movie: Protect the Tokyo Enetower!
 2013: Tokumei Sentai Go-Busters vs. Kaizoku Sentai Gokaiger: The Movie
 2013: Kamen Rider × Super Sentai × Space Sheriff: Super Hero Taisen Z
 2013: Zyuden Sentai Kyoryuger: Gaburincho of Music
 2014: Zyuden Sentai Kyoryuger vs. Go-Busters: The Great Dinosaur Battle! Farewell Our Eternal Friends
 2014: Heisei Riders vs. Shōwa Riders: Kamen Rider Taisen feat. Super Sentai
 2014: Ressha Sentai ToQger the Movie: Galaxy Line S.O.S.
 2015:  Ressha Sentai ToQger vs. Kyoryuger: The Movie
 2015: Super Hero Taisen GP: Kamen Rider 3
 2015: Shuriken Sentai Ninninger the Movie: The Dinosaur Lord's Splendid Ninja Scroll!
 2016: Shuriken Sentai Ninninger vs. ToQger the Movie: Ninja in Wonderland
 2016: Doubutsu Sentai Zyuohger the Movie: The Exciting Circus Panic!
 2017: Doubutsu Sentai Zyuohger vs. Ninninger the Movie: Super Sentai's Message from the Future
 2017: Kamen Rider × Super Sentai: Ultra Super Hero Taisen
 2017: Uchu Sentai Kyuranger the Movie: Gase Indaver Strikes Back
 2018: Kaitou Sentai Lupinranger VS Keisatsu Sentai Patranger en Film
 2019: Kishiryu Sentai Ryusoulger the Movie: Time Slip! Dinosaur Panic
 2020: Kishiryu Sentai Ryusoulger VS Lupinranger VS Patranger
 2020: Mashin Sentai Kiramager: Episode Zero
 2021: Mashin Sentai Kiramager The Movie: Bee-Bop Dream
 2021: Kikai Sentai Zenkaiger The Movie: Red Battle! All Sentai Rally!!
 2021: Kishiryu Sentai Ryusoulger Special Chapter: Memory of Soulmates
 2021: Saber + Zenkaiger: Superhero Senki
 2022: Avataro Sentai Donbrothers The Movie: New First Love Hero

V-Cinema releases
 1996: Chōriki Sentai Ohranger: Ohré vs. Kakuranger
 1997: Gekisou Sentai Carranger vs. Ohranger
 1998: Denji Sentai Megaranger vs. Carranger
 1999: Seijuu Sentai Gingaman vs. Megaranger
 1999: Kyuukyuu Sentai GoGoFive: Sudden Shock! A New Warrior!
 2000: Kyuukyuu Sentai GoGoFive vs. Gingaman
 2001: Mirai Sentai Timeranger vs. GoGoFive
 2001: Hyakujuu Sentai Gaoranger vs. Super Sentai
 2003: Ninpuu Sentai Hurricaneger vs. Gaoranger
 2004: Bakuryū Sentai Abaranger vs. Hurricaneger
 2005: Tokusou Sentai Dekaranger vs. Abaranger
 2006: Mahō Sentai Magiranger vs. Dekaranger
 2007: GoGo Sentai Boukenger vs. Super Sentai
 2008: Juken Sentai Gekiranger vs. Boukenger
 2010: Samurai Sentai Shinkenger Returns
 2011: Tensou Sentai Goseiger Returns
 2013: Tokumei Sentai Go-Busters Returns vs. Dōbutsu Sentai Go-Busters
 2013: Ninpuu Sentai Hurricaneger: 10 Years After
 2014: Zyuden Sentai Kyoryuger: 100 Years After
 2015: Ressha Sentai ToQger Returns
 2015: Tokusou Sentai Dekaranger: 10 Years After
 2016: Shuriken Sentai Ninninger Returns
 2017: Doubutsu Sentai Zyuohger Returns: Give Me Your Life! Earth Champion Tournament
 2017: Space Squad: Uchuu Keiji Gavan vs. Tokusou Sentai Dekaranger
 2017: Uchu Sentai Kyuranger: Episode of Stinger
 2018: Uchu Sentai Kyuranger vs. Space Squad
 2018: Engine Sentai Go-Onger: 10 Years Grand Prix
 2019: Lupinranger VS Patranger VS Kyuranger
 2021: Kiramager VS Ryusoulger The Movie
 2021: Kaizoku Sentai: Ten Gokaiger
 2022: Kikai Sentai Zenkaiger vs. Kiramager vs. Senpaiger
 2023: Ninpuu Sentai Hurricaneger Degozaru! Shushuuto 20th Anniversary
 2023: Bakuryu Sentai Abaranger 20th: The Unforgivable Abare
 2023:  Avataro Sentai Donbrothers VS Zenkaiger The Movie

Televi Magazine releases
The following releases were on Super Video or Special DVD bundled with special issues of Kodansha's Televi Magazine:
 1991: Chojin Sentai Jetman: Jetman’s Lethal Weapon-Graffiti
 1992: Kyoryu Sentai Zyuranger Dino Video
 1994: Ninja Sentai Kakuranger Super Video: The Hidden Scroll
 1995: Chouriki Sentai Ohranger: Super Video Ole! Chouriki Information Bureau
 1995: Chōriki Sentai Ohranger Member Notebook
 1996: Gekisou Sentai Carranger Super Video
 1997: Denji Sentai Megaranger Super Video: You Can Be One Too! A Mega Hero
 1998: Seijuu Sentai Gingaman Super Video: The Secret Fruit of Wisdom
 1999: Kyuukyuu Sentai GoGoFive: Five Lessons of Rescue Spirits
 2000: Mirai Sentai Timeranger Super Video: All the Strongest Hero Secrets
 2001: Hyakujuu Sentai Gaoranger Super Video: Showdown! Gaoranger vs. GaoSilver
 2002: Ninpuu Sentai Hurricaneger Super Video: Super Ninja vs Super Kuroko
 2003: Bakuryū Sentai Abaranger Super Video: All Bakuryuu Roaring Laughter Battle
 2004: Tokusou Sentai Dekaranger Super Video: Super-Special Technique Showdown! DekaRed vs. DekaBreak
 2005: Mahō Sentai Magiranger Special DVD: Great Presentation! The Super Magic of the Gold Grip Phone ~Goru Gooru Goo Goo~
 2007: Juken Sentai Gekiranger Special DVD: Gyun-Gyun! Fist Sage Great Athletic Meet
 2008: Engine Sentai Go-Onger Special DVD: It's a Seminar! Everyone GO-ON!!
 2009: Samurai Sentai Shinkenger Special DVD: The Light Samurai's Surprise Transformation
 2010: Tensou Sentai Goseiger Special DVD: Gotcha☆Miracle! Total Gathering Collection
 2011: Kaizoku Sentai Gokaiger Special DVD: Let's Do This Goldenly! Roughly! 36 Round Gokai Change!!
 2012: Tokumei Sentai Go-Busters vs. Beet Buster vs. J
 2013: Zyuden Sentai Kyoryuger: It's Here! Armed On Midsummer Festival!!
 2014: Ressha Sentai ToQger: Farewell, Ticket! The Wasteland Super ToQ Battle!
 2015: Shuriken Sentai Ninninger: Aka Ninger vs. Star Ninger Hundred Nin Battle!
 2018: Kaitou Sentai Lupinranger VS Keisatsu Sentai Patranger: Girlfriends Army

Distribution

Although the Super Sentai series originated in Japan, various Sentai series have been imported and dubbed in other languages for broadcast in several other countries.

Europe
Bioman, Flashman, Maskman, Liveman, Turboranger, Fiveman, and Jetman were broadcast in France in the 1980s and early 1990s, with Maskman and Liveman marketed as Bioman 2 and Bioman 3, respectively. Additionally, Liveman, Turboranger, Fiveman and Jetman were broadcast in Spain and Portugal. Denjiman and Goggle-V were broadcast in Italy. In addition, some episodes of Bioman and Turboranger were released on VHS in Greece. In 1985, Bioman became the first Super Sentai series to be aired in the United Kingdom. By the early 1990s, the Sentai broadcasts were replaced by Power Rangers.

South Korea

Super Sentai has been broadcast in South Korea, dubbed in Korean. The first such series was Choushinsei Flashman which aired as Jigu Bangwidae Flash Man (Earth Defence Squadron Flashman), released in video format in 1989 by the Daeyung Panda video company; this was followed by Hikari Sentai Maskman and Chodenshi Bioman. Throughout the 1990s, Dai Sentai Goggle Five, Dengeki Sentai Changeman, Choujyu Sentai Liveman, and Kousoku Sentai Turboranger were also released in video format. In the 2000s and early 2010s, Tooniverse (formerly Orion Cartoon Network), JEI-TV (Jaeneung Television), Champ TV/Anione TV (Daewon Broadcasting), Cartoon Network South Korea, and Nickelodeon South Korea have broadcast Super Sentai series a year following their original Japanese broadcast, but have changed the titles to "Power Rangers". Recently, there have been broadcasts of Bakuryuu Sentai Abaranger, Tokusou Sentai Dekaranger, Mahō Sentai Magiranger, GoGo Sentai Boukenger, Juken Sentai Gekiranger, Engine Sentai Go-onger, Hyakujuu Sentai Gaoranger, Tensou Sentai Goseiger, Kaizoku Sentai Gokaiger, Tokumei Sentai Go-Busters, Zyuden Sentai Kyoryuger, Ressha Sentai ToQger, Shuriken Sentai Ninninger, Doubutsu Sentai Zyuohger, Uchu Sentai Kyuranger, Kishiryu Sentai Ryusoulger, Kaitou Sentai Lupinranger VS Keisatsu Sentai Patranger, Kikai Sentai Zenkaiger and Avataro Sentai Donbrothers under the titles of Power Rangers Dino Thunder, Power Rangers S.P.D., Power Rangers Magic Force, Power Rangers Treasure Force, Power Rangers Wild Spirits, Power Rangers Engine Force, Power Rangers Jungle Force, Power Rangers Miracle Force, Power Rangers Captain Force, Power Rangers Go-Busters, Power Rangers Dino Force, Power Rangers Train Force, Power Rangers Ninja Force, Power Rangers Animal Force, Power Rangers Galaxy Force, Power Rangers Dino Soul Power Rangers Lupin Force VS Patrol Force, Power Rangers Zenkaiger and Power Rangers Donbrothers , respectively. Furthermore, Power Rangers Dino Force has the South Korea-exclusive sequel called Power Rangers Dino Force Brave. Currently South Korea is re airing Power Rangers Animal Force and airing Power Rangers Donbrothers.

Latin America
Choushinsei Flashman and Choujyu Sentai Liveman were broadcast in Bolivia, Ecuador and Peru in the early 1990s, and as reruns in the early 2000s. Flashman arrived with Spanish dubbing done in Brazil and Liveman in Venezuela.

Dengeki Sentai Changeman, Flashman, Maskman and Goggle V were broadcast in Brazil. The first season to air was Changeman in 1988, on TV Manchete (now RedeTV), and caused a tremendous impact in its time, considered a cult classic.

In the early 1990s, the Sentai broadcasts in Latin America were replaced by Power Rangers.

Philippines
In 1978, Himitsu Sentai Gorenger was the first Super Sentai series aired on Philippine television and followed by J.A.K.Q the next year, both on RPN and was dubbed in English. In 1986, ABS-CBN returned to the airwaves after the EDSA People Power that resurrected the country's democracy following the end of Ferdinand Marcos' 20-year   dictatorial rule as the network had shut down by his declaration of martial law in 1972. A year after Marcos was overthrown in 1987, ABS-CBN started to air Super Sentai series starting with Choudenshi Bioman then went on to do the Filipino dub of Hikari Sentai Maskman and continued until 1994 with Chojin Sentai Jetman.

In 1995, the network started to air the American-produced Power Rangers and continued until the end of Super Megaforce in 2015 when they rejected to air Dino Charge.

Malaysia
The Super Sentai series first aired in Malaysia starting with Choudenshi Bioman in 1986 and was dubbed in English. But two years later in 1988, the series started to dub in Malay with Choushinsei Flashman. In 1994, the Super Sentai broadcasts were replaced by the American-produced Power Rangers.

Mainland China and Taiwan
Taiyo Sentai Sun Vulcan was the first Super Sentai series aired in Taiwan in 1983. In 1987, Choudenshi Bioman was the first Super Sentai series aired in mainland China.

In 1994, the American-produced Power Rangers series started airing in Taiwan and in mainland China the following year in 1995 and since then the series continued to popularize despite Hong Kong continuing to air Super Sentai.

United States

After Honolulu's KIKU-TV had success with Android Kikaider (marketed as Kikaida) and Kamen Rider V3 in the 1970s, multiple Super Sentai series, including Himitsu Sentai Gorenger and Battle Fever J, were brought to the Hawaiian market, broadcast in Japanese with English subtitles by JN Productions. In 1985, Marvel Comics produced a pilot for an American adaptation of Taiyo Sentai Sun Vulcan, but the show was rejected by the major US TV networks. In 1986, Saban Productions produced a pilot for an American adaptation of Choudenshi Bioman titled Bio Man. In 1987, some episodes of Kagaku Sentai Dynaman were dubbed and aired as a parody on the USA Network television show Night Flight. Starting in 1993, footage from Super Sentai was extensively used in the American-produced Power Rangers franchise.

On 25 July 2014, Shout! Factory announced that they would release Zyuranger on DVD in the United States. Since then, Shout! has been the official distributor of Super Sentai DVDs in North America, and as of 2019 has released all subsequent series up to Hurricaneger, plus Jetman. After Jetman, a release was announced of the series Fiveman, but was put on hiatus due to Hasbro's acquisition of the Power Rangers franchise. In June 2022, it was announced they would resume production/distribution of Super Sentai DVD sets in North America, beginning with Fiveman.

Beginning in 2016, Super Sentai episodes would be available on demand on ShoutFactoryTV.com. These episodes can only be viewed in North America. Super Sentai episodes are also available to watch on the free streaming service, Tubi.

Merchandise
, Bandai Namco has sold  Super Sentai shape-changing model robots since 1979.

Parody and homage

The Super Sentai Series has been parodied and emulated in various ways throughout the world. The term "Sentai" is also occasionally used to describe shows with premises like the Super Sentai Series.

Dai-Nippon

Gainax produced a Japanese fan film called  in 1982 as a homage to the Super Sentai franchise.

Sport Ranger

The Thai TV series Sport Ranger, another homage to Super Sentai, aired in 2006.

France Five

Jushi Sentai France Five (later known as Shin Kenjushi France Five) is a French online mini-series that was released in six installments from 2000 to 2013. The series was so popular in Japan that Akira Kushida recorded its second opening theme.

Legendary Armor Samurai Troopers

Known as Ronin Warriors in the English dub, this anime involved five young warriors each in possession of mystical armor and weapons which allowed them to transform into more powerful forms in the manner of Super Sentai.

Sailor Moon

Naoko Takeuchi used the Super Sentai Series as inspiration for the creation of the Sailor Soldiers in Sailor Moon.

Digimon Frontier

The fourth entry of the Digimon anime involved five young kids (eventually six) to gain Digivices known as D-tectors which contained the spirits of ancient heroes known as the Ten Legendary Warriors that allowed them to transform into Digimon forms to fight off monsters in a manner reminiscent of Super Sentai.

Jeanne d'Arc

The Jeanne d'Arc PSP game made by Level 5 which depicts the title character (voiced by Maaya Sakamoto in Japanese and Kari Wahlgren in English respectively) in a fantasy universe based on the historical story has her and certain others with the power to transform into armored warriors akin to Super Sentai.

Kingdom Hearts

The PSP prequel entry to the Kingdom Hearts video game franchise made by Square-Enix involves the main characters (Terra, Aqua, and Ventus) transforming into magical armor akin to Super Sentai.

Sparanger
As part of the Omoikkiri Ii!! TV television program, a series of features was produced on various spas and onsen around Japan titled .

EA's Rock
In 2013, Gainax produced , a 13-episode miniseries of live-action shorts which parodied the Super Sentai Series. The series' characters are all former members of a fighting group called . EA's Rock is broadcast on the Tōmeihan Net 6 Japanese Association of Independent Television Stations as well as Nico Nico Douga.

Akibaranger

 is a Toei-produced parody series that premiered in April 2012 on BS Asahi and Tokyo MX. Akibaranger is made for adult fans who were fans of the Super Sentai Series as children. The story features three otaku who live in the Akihabara district of Tokyo who receive technology from a scientist to fight an evil threat that at first only exists in their delusions, but eventually starts materializing itself in the real world. Like Kaizoku Sentai Gokaiger, Akibaranger features guest appearances by veteran Super Sentai actors (as themselves rather than their characters), and voice actors and musicians who have worked in anime and tokusatsu. A second season aired in April 2013.

Bleach

The manga/anime franchise Bleach has referenced Super Sentai twice. First with Nelliel Tu Odelschwanck and her Fracción (Dondochakka Birstanne, Pesche Guatiche, and Bawabawa) taking Sentai poses and introductions when they first encounter the protagonists in Hueco Mundo. The second is when Kisuke Urahara establishes the team of Karakura Raizer (lead by Kon) to protect Karakura Town in the heroes' absence, with their powers and introductions clearly inspired from Super Sentai teams.

Love After World Domination

The manga/anime series Love After World Domination is a satire on the Super Sentai genre, with a team of multi-color heroes who can don spandex power suits to fight against an organization bent on world domination.

Dragon Ball

Akira Toriyama was inspired to create the Ginyu Force for the Dragon Ball manga after seeing his children watch Super Sentai.

Yu-Gi-Oh!
The anime series Yu-Gi-Oh! VRAINS (2017) pays homage to the Super Sentai series, with the character Shima occasionally performing Sentai moves. The English dub adds a joke referring to a Sentai move as "the dab", referencing how the dab dance move in 2010s American popular culture has a striking resemblance to Sentai moves that have appeared in the Super Sentai series since the 1970s (and the localised Power Rangers series since the 1990s).

One Piece

Germa 66's Vinsmoke commanders bear a resemblance to Super Sentai series, as they bear similar color-coded designs and epithets: Reiju is "Poison Pink", Ichiji "Sparking Red", Niji "Electric Blue", Yonji "Winch Green", and Sanji "Stealth Black". These colors are also prominently incorporated into their clothing and hair color (except for Sanji).

The Red/Blue/Pink/Green team alignment matches that of J.A.K.Q. Dengekitai, the first and only Sentai squad which started with four members.

The clone soldiers used by the Germa likewise resemble the various foot soldiers used by the villains in Sentai series.

Pretty Cure

The Pretty Cure franchise largely resembles Super Sentai as a tokusatsu-style magical girl series with varying teams of girls over the years, as well as the fact that it is long-aired alongside Super Sentai on TV on Sunday mornings.

References

External links
Official Super Sentai website 
Toei Video's Super Sentai DVD Soft Guide 
Bandai's Super Sentai website 
Toei International Special Content: Super Sentai Series
Shout! Factory's Official Super Sentai website

 
Bandai brands
Fiction about size change
Japanese children's television series
Mass media franchises introduced in 1975
Superhero television shows
Toei tokusatsu